Reinhold Hucker (born 15 November 1949) is a German former wrestler who competed in the 1972 Summer Olympics. He was born in Unterelchingen.

References

External links
 

1949 births
Living people
Olympic wrestlers of West Germany
Wrestlers at the 1972 Summer Olympics
German male sport wrestlers